Lampyris raymondi is a firefly species of the genus Lampyris, belonging to the order Coleoptera.

Description
This insect presents a conspicuous sexual dimorphism. The females generally are longer than males (up to 25mm in length). They are larviform, do not have wings and produce a continuous glow ("glowworms"). They use their bioluminescence to attract mates. The males are winged, elytra are brown, with a yellow border on the elytral suture. Pronotum is slightly more elongated. The abdomen is yellowish, with a very convex last dorsal segment.

The body of the larvae is composed by 12 bright black segments. It shows two whitish or pale pink spots at the rear edge of each segment, with four spots on the first segment (corresponding to the pronotum). It can be easily distinguished from Lampyris noctiluca, that has just two spots on the first segment. In spring these predatory larvae can often be seen on paths in daylight.

Distribution

References

External links
 Natura Mediterraneo
 La vida de las luciernagas
 Geisthardt M., 1985: Materials for a revision of the genus lampyris

Lampyridae
Beetles of Europe
Bioluminescent insects
Taxa named by Étienne Mulsant
Beetles described in 1859